Shao Yaqi (born 28 November 1996) is a Chinese fencer. She competed in the women's individual sabre event at the 2018 Asian Games, winning the silver medal.

References

1996 births
Living people
Chinese female fencers
Place of birth missing (living people)
Asian Games medalists in fencing
Asian Games silver medalists for China
Fencers at the 2018 Asian Games
Medalists at the 2018 Asian Games
Fencers at the 2020 Summer Olympics
Olympic fencers of China
21st-century Chinese women